Carr Township is one of twelve townships in Clark County, Indiana. As of the 2020 census, its population was 4,830 and it contained 1,794 housing units.

History
Carr Township was organized in 1854. It was named for General John Carr, a pioneer settler.

Geography

Unincorporated towns
 Bennettsville
 Broom Hill
 Carwood
 Wilson

Adjacent townships
 Monroe Township (northeast)
 Union Township (northeast)
 Silver Creek Township (southeast)
 New Albany Township, Floyd County (south)
 Lafayette Township, Floyd County (southwest)
 Wood Township (west)

Major highways
  Indiana State Road 60
  Indiana State Road 111

Cemeteries
The township contains Several cemeteries: Adkins, Allen (aka Jenkins), Hagest (aka Keibler and Hitch), Hickory Grove, Merrill-Ward, Miller, St. John the Baptist Catholic, Stone Grave at Deam Lake, and Wagner.

References
 
 United States Census Bureau cartographic boundary files

External links

 Indiana Township Association
 United Township Association of Indiana

Townships in Clark County, Indiana
Townships in Indiana
Populated places established in 1854
1854 establishments in Indiana